Skaun is a small village in Skaun municipality in Trøndelag county, Norway. Skaun Church is located in the village.

References

Villages in Trøndelag
Skaun